The 2019 CONCACAF League Final was the final round of the 2019 CONCACAF League, the third edition of the CONCACAF League, the secondary club football tournament organised by CONCACAF, the regional governing body of North America, Central America, and the Caribbean.

The final was contested in two-legged home-and-away format between Saprissa from Costa Rica and Motagua from Honduras. The first leg was hosted by Saprissa at the Estadio Ricardo Saprissa Aymá in Tibás on 7 November 2019, while the second leg was hosted by Motagua at the Estadio Tiburcio Carías Andino in Tegucigalpa on 26 November 2019.

Saprissa won the final 1–0 on aggregate for their first CONCACAF League title.

Teams

For the third consecutive season, the final of the CONCACAF League was competed between teams from Costa Rica and Honduras.

Venues

Road to the final

Note: In all results below, the score of the finalist is given first (H: home; A: away).

Format
The final was played on a home-and-away two-legged basis, with the team with the better performance in previous rounds (excluding preliminary round) hosting the second leg.

The away goals rule would not be applied, and extra time would be played if the aggregate score was tied after the second leg. If the aggregate score was still tied after extra time, the penalty shoot-out would be used to determine the winner (Regulations II, Article G).

Performance ranking

Matches

First leg

Second leg

References

External links

Final
2019
2019–20 in Costa Rican football
2019–20 in Honduran football
Sports competitions in San José, Costa Rica
International association football competitions hosted by Honduras
International association football competitions hosted by Costa Rica
November 2019 sports events in North America
Deportivo Saprissa matches
F.C. Motagua matches